Sri Maharaja Samaragrawira or also known as Rakai Warak was a ruler of the Mataram Kingdom of Central Java from approximately 800 to 819.
This name is found in the list of kings of Mataram in the Mantyasih inscription.

One theory put forward by historian Slamet Muljana suggests that the original name is Samaragrawira, the father of Balaputradewa, King of Srivijaya.

References

 Marwati Poesponegoro & Nugroho Notosusanto. 1990. Sejarah Nasional Indonesia Jilid II. Jakarta: Balai Pustaka
 Slamet Muljana. 2006. Sriwijaya (terbitan ulang 1960). Yogyakarta: LKIS

Indonesian Buddhist monarchs
Javanese monarchs
Mataram Kingdom
9th-century Indonesian people